With My Favorite "Vegetables" & Other Bizarre Muzik is the second album by Ant-Bee, released in 1994 through Divine Records.

Track listing

Personnel 
Musicians
Greg Brosius (Lunar Egg-Clips) – keyboards, freaky laughter
Bunk Gardner – saxophone, snorks, wheezes, assorted screams
Billy James (The Ant-Bee) – vocals, drums, percussion, keyboards, mellotron, tape manipulations, production, illustration
Paul Lamb (Mr. Lambchop) – bass guitar, French horn
Rod Martin (Mod Martion) – guitar
Marc Ray Oxendine (The Tragic Sunbeam) – bass guitar, psaltery
Don Preston (Dom DeWilde) – keyboards, vegetables, assorted transformations
Scott Renfroe (Reoccurring Schizms) – tape manipulations
Production and additional personnel
Jimmy Carl Black (The Indian of the Group) – spoken word, assorted munchkinisms
John Criss (Mr. Crisp) – piano on "Moonpie"
Roy Estrada (Pachuco Falsetto) – bizarre laughter
Roy Herman (Herman Monster) – guitar on "Moonpie," "Lunar Egg-Clips Run Amuck," "The Girl With The Stars In Her Hair," "The Live Jam," "Here We Go Round The Lemon Tree," and slide and electric guitar on, "Do You Like Worms."
Scott Kolden (Nedlok Tocs) – engineering, recording
Alan McBrayer – illustrations
Jim Sherwood (Euclid James Sherwood) – snorks, spoken word
Dan Simon – engineering
Rick Snyder (Purple Plastic Pengui) – bass guitar on "Worms"

References

External links 
 

Ant-Bee albums
1994 albums